Henry Pyne (1504/5 – 1556 or later), of Ham in Morwenstow, Cornwall, was an English politician.

He was a Member (MP) of the Parliament of England for Liskeard in 1529.

References

1505 births
16th-century deaths
English MPs 1529–1536
People from Morwenstow
Members of the Parliament of England (pre-1707) for Liskeard